R. Achmad Rivai is a rear admiral in the Indonesian Navy who served as a senior officer (Indonesian: Perwira Tinggi) to the chief of staff of Kasal. The last position of this two-star general was TA Pengkaji Bid. National Defense System System.

Career
He graduated from the AAL-33 TA Naval Academy in 1988. He has served various assignments both on warships and on staff.

His education and training also includes Korbantem (1990), Pikspespa/Artileri Angkatan 6 (1992/1993), Diklapa ll/Koum Angkatan 11 (1997/1998), Sekolah Staf dan Komando TNI Angkatan Laut (Seskoal) Angkatan 39 (2001), Sekolah Staf dan Komando (Sesko) TNI Angkatan 38 (2011) and Lemhannas Rl PPRA Angkatan ke-53 (2015).

Abdul Rasyid Kacong held the role in charge of finding the wreck of the Sriwijaya Air plane that crashed in the waters of the Thousand Islands, Jakarta. He led the Indonesian Navy forces with 10 ships at night in the search for Sriwijaya Air SJ182 on 9 January. He served as the commander of the Fleet Command I in the search for the Sriwijaya Air SJ182 plane that crashed on Laki Island, Sunday, 10 January 2021. A team of divers from the Indonesian Navy was also deployed in the search process. The Navy have prepared KRI Dishidros, who has the capability in conducting underwater searches.

Awards
 
 Satyalancana Seroja

 Bintang Jalasena Nararya

 Satyalancana Kesetiaan 24 years' service

 Satyalancana Kesetiaan 16 years' service

 Satyalancana Kesetiaan 8 years' service

 Satyalancana Dwidya Sistha

 Satyalancana Kebhaktian Sosial

 Satyalancana Dharma Nusa

 Satyalancana Wira Dharma

 Satyalancana Wira Nusa

Position 
 Marine Weapons Division (Padiv) Officer KRI Badik (1990)
Head of Ops KRI Mandau
Palaksa KRI Tjiptadi
Palaksa KRI Badik
Commander of KRI Sura
Commander Lanal Nunukan (2006)
Satkerbar Commander (2008)
Armabar Strict Commander (2009)
Asops Guskamlabar (2009)
Paban l Strategic Plan Srena Headquarters (2011)
Asops Pangarmabar (2013)
Deputy Commander of Lantamal III Jakarta (2015)
Commander Lantamai Il Padang (2016)
Pankolinlamil (2018)
TA Reviewer Bid. National Defense System System (2018)
Special Staff of Kasal (2019)

See also
Indonesian military ranks

References

Living people
Indonesian admirals
Chiefs of Staff of the Indonesian Navy
Year of birth missing (living people)